Gëzim Dibra (born 8 November 1956) was a member of the Assembly of the Republic of Albania for the Democratic Party of Albania.

Gëzim died on 12 August 2011.  He was replaced by Ramiz Çobaj.

References

Democratic Party of Albania politicians
1956 births
2011 deaths
Place of birth missing
Members of the Parliament of Albania
21st-century Albanian politicians